Peringiella denticulata is a species of minute sea snail, a marine gastropod mollusk or micromollusk in the family Rissoidae.

Description

Peringiella denticulata possesses a white and yellow sheen and has a simple spiral shape; it tends retain the size of about 3 millimeters from top to bottom. Peringiella denticulata possesses vertical striations both inside and out.

Distribution

In the North Atlantic Ocean, Peringiella denticulata is located in European waters (of the ERMS scope) and the Portuguese Exclusive Economic Zone. It is also found throughout the Spanish Exclusive Economic Zone.

References

Rissoidae
Gastropods described in 1985